FX Productions (FXP) is an American television and in-house production company owned by FX Networks (and jointed with Disney Television Studios), a division of the Disney Entertainment unit of The Walt Disney Company. The studio currently produces series for FX, FXX and FX on Hulu, as well as TBS (Miracle Workers). In the past, FXP also produced series for Amazon Prime Video (One Mississippi) and Fox (The Cool Kids), but have since returned sole focus on the FX channels.

History

FX Productions was formed in August 2007 to take stakes in FX programming. Eric Schrier add senior vice president of FX Productions to the post of senior vice president of original programming in charge of current series and alternative programming.

In July 2014, Fox Networks Group and DNA Films formed DNA TV Limited joint venture. Fox Networks Group would have first global first rights with co-financing options to the joint venture's shows. DNA TV would be managed by DNA Films management with Eric Schrier, president of Original Programming for FX Networks and FX Productions handling Fox's joint venture interest.

Paul Simms signed an overall television production deal with FXP in October 2017.

In November 2019, it was announced that a number of new series originally ordered for FX produced by FX Productions before the Disney-Fox merger would be carried over to Hulu as part of the move of FX's streaming presence for most of the network's library not already under contract with another streaming provider. The series would remain under the purview of FX Productions, and be marketed under a new Hulu sub-brand, "FX on Hulu". It was planned by the end of 2021 that a third of Hulu's original series input would be produced by FX Productions. More recently, Debra Moore Munoz has struck a deal with FX Productions.

Television programs

References

2007 establishments in the United States
Television production companies of the United States
FX Networks
Disney Television Studios